The Premio Vittorio di Capua is a Group 2 flat horse race in Italy open to thoroughbreds aged three years or older. It is run at Milan over a distance of 1,600 metres (about 1 mile), and it is scheduled to take place each year in September or October.

The event is named in memory of Vittorio di Capua, a former president of San Siro Racecourse, who was kidnapped and murdered in the 1970s.

For several years the Premio Vittorio di Capua held Group 2 status. It was promoted to Group 1 level in 1988 and downgraded back to Group 2 in 2017.

Records
Most successful horse since 1980 (2 wins):
 Sikeston – 1990, 1991
 Alhijaz – 1992, 1993
 Slickly – 2001, 2002
 Out Of Time - 2019, 2020

Leading jockey since 1980 (5 wins):
 Frankie Dettori – Muhtathir (1999), Slickly (2001, 2002), Ancient World (2004), Rio de la Plata (2010)

Leading trainer since 1980 (6 wins):
 Saeed bin Suroor – Muhtathir (1999), Slickly (2001, 2002), Ancient World (2004), Gladiatorus (2009), Rio de la Plata (2010)

Leading owner since 1980 (6 wins):
 Godolphin – Muhtathir (1999), Slickly (2001, 2002), Ancient World (2004), Gladiatorus (2009), Rio de la Plata (2010)

Winners since 1988

 The 2008 running was cancelled because of a strike.
 The 2017 winner Amore Hass was later exported to Hong Kong and renamed Xiang Bai Qi.
 The 2021 running took place at Capannelle.

Earlier winners
 1980: Isopach
 1981: Esclavo
 1982: Kilian
 1983: Coquelin

 1984: King of Clubs
 1985: Capo Nord
 1986: Star Cutter
 1987: Paris-Turf

See also
 List of Italian flat horse races

References

 Racing Post:

 galopp-sieger.de – Premio Vittorio di Capua.
 horseracingintfed.com – International Federation of Horseracing Authorities – Premio Vittorio di Capua (2016).
 pedigreequery.com – Premio Vittorio di Capua – Milano San Siro.

Horse races in Italy
Open mile category horse races
Sport in Milan